Kostyantyn Andriyovych Parkhomenko (born May 25, 1991) is a Ukrainian football player who last played for FC Sakhalin Yuzhno-Sakhalinsk. He also holds Russian citizenship.

Career
He made his Russian National Football League debut for FC Sakhalin Yuzhno-Sakhalinsk on July 6, 2014 in a game against FC Anzhi Makhachkala.

He is a son of Andriy Parkhomenko and nephew of Dmytro Parkhomenko, both footballers.

References

1991 births
Living people
Footballers from Odesa
Ukrainian footballers
Ukraine student international footballers
FC Dnister Ovidiopol players
FC Oleksandriya players
FC Helios Kharkiv players
FC Stal Kamianske players
FC Balkany Zorya players
Ukrainian expatriate footballers
Expatriate footballers in Russia
Ukrainian expatriate sportspeople in Russia
FC Sakhalin Yuzhno-Sakhalinsk players
Association football midfielders
Ukrainian First League players